was an admiral in the Imperial Japanese Navy.

Biography

Military career
Yoshida was born as the fourth son of an ex-samurai, Mine Kohachi, in Saga prefecture in 1885, and was adopted into the family of a local rice merchant named Yoshida. The future Fleet Admiral Mineichi Koga was a friend from his childhood. Yoshida was graduate of the 32nd class of the Imperial Japanese Naval Academy in 1904, ranking 12th out of 190 cadets. The  Russo-Japanese War had just started, and he served as a midshipman, he served on the submarine tender , and participated in the Battle of Tsushima aboard the cruiser . 

He attended naval artillery and torpedo school in 1906–1907, and was then assigned to the destroyer  followed by the cruiser . As a lieutenant from 1909, he specialized in torpedo warfare, and graduated from the Naval Staff College in 1913. His classmates included Kōichi Shiozawa and Shigetarō Shimada.

Yoshida was promoted to lieutenant commander in 1915, and commander in 1919, serving in a variety of administrative positions, primarily concerned with training. After his promotion to captain in 1923, he was given his first command in 1924; the cruiser . He served as chief of staff of the Maizuru Naval District from 1924 to 1925. In December 1927, he assumed command of the battleship , and from December 1928, battleship . He was promoted to rear admiral on 30 November 1929. 

Yoshida served as chief-of-staff of the Combined Fleet from December 1931 to September 1933 and was promoted to vice admiral on 15 November 1934, and Director, Bureau of Naval Affairs, within the Navy Ministry. He was then made commander of the Training Fleet from February to December 1936, and of the IJN 2nd Fleet from December 1936, and commander-in-chief of the Combined Fleet to December 1937.

Political career
On 30 August 1939, Yoshida became Navy Minister under the cabinet of Prime Minister Abe Nobuyuki. He continued in the same position under the administrations of Yonai Mitsumasa and Konoe Fumimaro. As Navy Minister, Yoshida was vehement in his opposition to signing of the Tripartite Pact between Japan, Nazi Germany and fascist Italy.  He also strongly opposed the idea of war against the United States. He was forced to resign due to illness and opposition to the pact on 5 September 1940, just before the arrival of the negotiating team from Germany, and the treaty went ahead despite his strong misgivings.

Yoshida was promoted to full admiral on 15 November 1940 and was made a member of the Supreme War Council. After the start of World War II, Yoshida was assigned a combat command, and took control of the China Area Fleet from November 1942. In December 1943 he became commandant of the Naval Staff College, and from May 1944 was commander of the Yokosuka Naval District. He entered the reserves in June 1945. 

Yoshida died in November 1966, and his grave is at the Tama Cemetery in Fuchū, Tokyo.

Decorations
 1924 –  Order of the Sacred Treasure, 3rd class 
 1934 –  Order of the Sacred Treasure, 2nd class

In popular culture
In the 1970 film Tora! Tora! Tora!, Yoshida was portrayed by Japanese actor Junya Usami.

References

External links

Notes

1885 births
1966 deaths
People from Saga Prefecture
Imperial Japanese Navy admirals
Japanese admirals of World War II
Ministers of the Imperial Japanese Navy
Recipients of the Order of the Sacred Treasure, 2nd class